Northbrook Lodge on Osgood Pond is a historic camp located within the Adirondack Forest Preserve in Paul Smiths in Franklin County, New York.  The camp complex was built by noted great camp builder Benjamin A. Muncil for Canadian Senator Wilfrid Laurier McDougald Construction took circa 1925.  Contributing resources in the camp complex include a small stone electrical building; covered canoe slips; pumphouse; stone bridge ; guideboat house; tennis cottage and court; dining room; kitchen; breezeway; library; shuffleboard court; Marcy cabin; boathouse; Gabriels cabin; Main cabin; Whiteface cabin; and Fairfield / staff house.  The buildings exhibit American Craftsman style architectural influences.  Northbrook Lodge was operate as a summer resort until 2009 and is now privately owned.

It was listed on the National Register of Historic Places in 2014.

References

Residential buildings on the National Register of Historic Places in New York (state)
Adirondack Great Camps
Houses completed in 1919
Buildings and structures in Franklin County, New York
National Register of Historic Places in Franklin County, New York
Paul Smiths, New York
American Craftsman architecture in New York (state)